Jan Kohoutek (born 16 August 1971) is a Czech former luger. He competed in the men's singles and doubles events at the 1992 Winter Olympics.

References

External links
 

1971 births
Living people
Czech male lugers
Olympic lugers of Czechoslovakia
Lugers at the 1992 Winter Olympics
Place of birth missing (living people)